La Viña (Salta) is a village and rural municipality in Salta Province in northwestern Argentina.

References

La Viña | Salta

Populated places in Salta Province